Bartlett Regional Hospital (BRH) is a hospital serving Juneau, Alaska, the capital city of Alaska and the largest city in Southeast Alaska. The hospital is owned by the City and Borough of Juneau. BRH is the only hospital in Juneau, and provides the only emergency department in the city. In addition, BRH operates the adjacent Rainforest Recovery Center, an inpatient and outpatient drug and alcohol treatment center.

Bartlett Regional Hospital has 45 beds, and 76 doctors on staff. The hospital is located at 3260 Hospital Drive, in the Twin Lakes area of Juneau, adjacent to Egan Drive.

History

Bartlett Regional Hospital was originally known as St. Ann's Hospital, and opened in 1886 in downtown Juneau. The hospital was run by the Sisters of Saint Ann until the 1960s. In 1965, control of the hospital was turned over to the City and Borough of Juneau, which built a new hospital on its current location in the Twin Lakes area.

The current hospital was named for Edward Lewis "Bob" Bartlett, an Alaskan politician who served as Alaska's first United States Senator.

Hospital rating data
The HealthGrades website contains the clinical quality data for Bartlett Regional Hospital, as of 2017. For this rating section three different types of data from HealthGrades are presented: clinical quality ratings for nine inpatient conditions and procedures, nine patient safety indicators and the percentage of patients giving the hospital as a 9 or 10 (the two highest possible ratings).

For inpatient conditions and procedures, there are three possible ratings: worse than expected, as expected, better than expected.  For this hospital the data for this category is:
 Worse than expected – 5
 As expected – 4
 Better than expected – 0
For patient safety indicators, there are the same three possible ratings. For this hospital safety indicators were rated as:
 Worse than expected – 1
 As expected – 8
 Better than expected – 0
Percentage of patients rating this hospital as a 9 or 10 – 68%
Percentage of patients who on average rank hospitals as a 9 or 10 – 69%

References

External links

1886 establishments in Alaska
1965 in Alaska
Buildings and structures in Juneau, Alaska
Hospitals established in 1886
Hospitals in Alaska
Pre-statehood history of Alaska